Christian Sophus Klein (17 August 1824 – 9 January 1900) was a Danish politician, a member of the National Party. He was Minister of Justice from 1872 to 1875, and Minister for Iceland from 1874 to 1875.

Biography 
Klein was born on 17 August 1824 in Copenhagen. He served as president of Sø- og Handelsretten (1862–72), and an accessor in Denmark's supreme court between 1877 and 1891.

He was a member of the Folketing between1858–1898, and served as the Justice Minister between 1872 and 1875. After implementing the Constitutional Law for Iceland, he served as minister for Iceland between 1874 and 1875.

References

External links 

 

1824 births
1900 deaths
Danish Justice Ministers
20th-century Danish politicians
University of Copenhagen alumni
People from Copenhagen
Ministers for Iceland